Nawaz Sardar (born 27 October 1987) is a Pakistani cricketer. He played in 26 first-class and 22 List A matches between 2002 and 2012. He made his Twenty20 debut on 26 April 2005, for Sialkot Stallions in the 2004–05 National Twenty20 Cup.

References

External links
 

1987 births
Living people
Pakistani cricketers
Sialkot Stallions cricketers
Sheikhupura cricketers
Water and Power Development Authority cricketers
Cricketers from Sheikhupura